Darke County is a county in the U.S. state of Ohio. As of the 2020 census, the population was 51,881. Its county seat and largest city is Greenville. The county was created in 1809 and later organized in 1817. It is named for William Darke, an officer in the American Revolutionary War. Darke County comprises the Greenville, OH Micropolitan Statistical Area, which is also included in the Dayton-Springfield-Sidney, OH Combined Statistical Area.

Geography

Adjacent counties

Mercer County (north)
Shelby County (northeast)
Miami County (east)
Montgomery County (southeast)
Preble County (south)
Wayne County, Indiana (southwest)
Randolph County, Indiana (west)
Jay County, Indiana (northwest)

Demographics

2000 census
As of the census of 2000, there were 53,309 people, 20,419 households, and 14,905 families living in the county. The population density was 89 people per square mile (34/km2). There were 21,583 housing units at an average density of 36 per square mile (14/km2). The racial makeup of the county was 98.09% White, 0.39% Black or African American, 0.17% Native American, 0.25% Asian, 0.02% Pacific Islander, 0.34% from other races, and 0.74% from two or more races. 0.86% of the population were Hispanic or Latino of any race. 43.1% were of German, 20.1% American, 8.1% English, 6.8% Irish and 5.8% French ancestry according to Census 2000.

There were 20,419 households, out of which 33.30% had children under the age of 18 living with them, 61.00% were married couples living together, 8.00% had a female householder with no husband present, and 27.00% were non-families. 23.50% of all households were made up of individuals, and 11.00% had someone living alone who was 65 years of age or older. The average household size was 2.56, and the average family size was 3.03.

In the county, the population was spread out, with 26.30% under the age of 18, 7.80% from 18 to 24, 27.50% from 25 to 44, 23.20% from 45 to 64, and 15.30% who were 65 years of age or older. The median age was 37 years. For every 100 females, there were 96.10 males. For every 100 females age 18 and over, there were 93.30 males.

The median income for a household in the county was $39,307, and the median income for a family was $45,735. Males had a median income of $32,933 versus $23,339 for females. The per capita income for the county was $18,670. About 6.00% of families and 8.00% of the population were below the poverty line, including 10.10% of those under age 18 and 9.20% of those age 65 or over.

2010 census
As of the 2010 United States Census, there were 52,959 people, 20,929 households, and 14,673 families living in the county. The racial makeup of the county was 97.8% white, 0.4% black or African American, 0.3% Asian, 0.2% American Indian, 0.4% from other races, and 0.9% from two or more races. Those of Hispanic or Latino origin made up 1.2% of the population. In terms of ancestry, 38.9% were German, 11.5% were American, 10.6% were Irish, and 9.0% were English.

Of the 20,929 households, 31.9% had children under the age of 18 living with them, 56.7% were married couples living together, 9.0% had a female householder with no husband present, 29.9% were non-families, and 25.9% of all households were made up of individuals. The average household size was 2.50, and the average family size was 3.00. The median age was 40.8 years.

The median income for a household in the county was $44,280, and the median income for a family was $53,454. Males had a median income of $40,402 versus $28,310 for females. The per capita income for the county was $21,483. About 7.5% of families and 10.6% of the population were below the poverty line, including 14.5% of those under age 18 and 8.1% of those age 65 or over.

Politics
Originally settled by numerous migrants from the South, prior to 1912, Darke County supported Democratic presidential candidates. It voted for Republicans only three times from 1856 to 1908. The county was a bellwether from 1912 to 1936. 

But starting with the 1940 election, it has become a Republican stronghold in presidential elections. Lyndon B. Johnson was the only Democratic candidate supported by county voters since then.

|}

Government
Darke County has a three-member Board of County Commissioners who oversee the various county departments, in similar fashion to all but two of the 88 Ohio counties. Darke County's elected commissioners are Mike Rhoades, Mike Stegall, and Matt Aultman.

Education

Public school districts
 Ansonia Local Schools
 Ansonia High School, Ansonia (the Tigers)
 Arcanum-Butler Local School District
 Arcanum High School, Arcanum (the Trojans)
 Franklin Monroe Schools
 Franklin Monroe Middle School/High School, Pitsburg (the Jets)
 Greenville City School District
 Greenville Senior High School, Greenville (the Green Wave)
 Mississinawa Valley Local School District
 Mississinawa Valley Junior/Senior High School, Union City (the Blackhawks)
 Tri-Village Local School District
 Tri-Village High School, New Madison (the Patriots)
 Versailles Exempted Village Schools
 Versailles High School, Versailles (the Tigers)

Communities

City
Greenville (county seat)

Villages

Ansonia
Arcanum
Bradford
Burkettsville
Castine
Gettysburg
Gordon
Hollansburg
Ithaca
New Madison
New Weston
North Star
Osgood
Palestine
Pitsburg
Rossburg
Union City
Versailles
Wayne Lakes
Yorkshire

Townships

Adams
Allen
Brown
Butler
Franklin
Greenville
Harrison
Jackson
Liberty
Mississinawa
Monroe
Neave
Patterson
Richland
Twin
Van Buren
Wabash
Washington
Wayne
York

Unincorporated communities

 Abbottsville
 Beamsville
 Braffetsville
 Brock
 Coletown
 Dawn
 Delisle
 Fort Jefferson
 Frenchtown
 Hill Grove
 Horatio
 Jaysville
 Lightsville
 Nashville
 New Harrison
 Otterbein
 Painter Creek
 Pikeville
 Poplar Ridge
 Rose Hill
 Savona
 Stelvideo
 Tampico
 Weavers
 Webster
 Willowdell
 Woodington
 Yankeetown

Historic places
Darke County has 25 places listed on the National Register of Historic Places, including the Darke County Courthouse, Sheriff's House, and Jail, and the Versailles Town Hall and Wayne Township House.  

Darke County is home to the Eldora Speedway located near New Weston, which hosts many big events throughout the year.

Notable residents
 Joseph Lowery Johnson, U.S. ambassador to Liberia
 Lucullus Virgil McWhorter, farmer and frontiersman
 Annie Oakley, famed 19th-century markswoman
 Lowell Thomas, travel author and broadcaster

See also
National Register of Historic Places listings in Darke County, Ohio

Footnotes

Further reading
 Frazer E. Wilson, History of Darke County, Ohio from Its Earliest Settlement to the Present Time: Also Biographical Sketches of Many Representative Citizens of the County. In Two Volumes. Milford, OH: Hobart Publishing Co., 1914. Volume 1 | Volume 2
 A Biographical History of Darke County, Ohio: Compendium of National Biography. Chicago: Lewis Publishing Co., 1900.
 The History of Darke County, Ohio Containing a History of the County; Its Cities, Towns, etc.; General and Local Statistics; Portraits of Early Settlers and Prominent Men; History of the Northwest Territory; History of Ohio; Map of Darke County; Constitution of the United States, Miscellaneous Matters, etc., etc. Chicago: W.H. Beers and Co., 1880.

External links
Darke County Government's website

 
1817 establishments in Ohio